Suhail Mohammed Faraj Al Mazroui (Arabic: سهيل محمد فرج المزروعي) is an Emirati businessman and politician, who has been serving as the minister of energy in the United Arab Emirates since March 2013.

Early life
Al Mazroui was born on the 3rd of July 1973 in Dubai, United Arab Emirates.

Mazroui graduated with a petroleum engineering degree from the University of Tulsa in 1996.

Career
Al Mazroui worked at the Abu Dhabi National Oil Company (ADNOC) for 10 years where he specialized in reservoir engineering and production operations. He served as CEO of ADNOC until 2007. Al Mazroui was the Director at Dolphin Energy for more than one year.

Al Mazroui, while working for Royal Dutch Shell, served in various capacities in international oil and gas projects in Nigeria, North Sea, Brunei and the Netherlands. 
 
Al Mazroui served as the deputy CEO of state-owned Mubadala Oil and Gas, where under his tutelage, he brought the company new development projects and investments in exploration and production throughout the Middle East region, Africa, and Kazakhastan. He was with Mubadala until March 2013, when he was appointed Energy Minister.

Al Mazroui was vice-chairman of Sorouh Real Estate from 2009 to 2013. Sorouh merged with Aldar Properties in 2013.

In April 2015, he was appointed to the position of managing director of IPIC. IPIC and Mubadala Investment Company completed their US$125 billion merger in 2017. He served as the chairman of the board of directors for CEPSA (2015-2018), the Spanish multinational oil and gas company, where Mubadala Investment Company is the largest shareholder. In December 2017, Suhail M. Al-Mazroui was elected as president of OPEC, for one year(1 January–December 2018).

Cabinet positions
In a reshuffle of 12 March 2013, he was appointed Minister of Energy to the cabinet led by Prime Minister Mohammed bin Rashid Al Maktoum, replacing Mohammed bin Dhaen Al Hamli in the post. In October 2017, in a new cabinet, Industry was added to his portfolio, where he became Minister of Energy & Industry. Al Mazroui also became the head of the Federal Electricity and Water Authority(FEWA). Al Mazroui, at the 2018 Bloomberg Middle East Global Leaders Forum, stated that the thing that keeps him up at night "is water"; and why sustainability is a key component of his mission as minister of energy and  industry.

He is a member of the advisory committee of Abu Dhabi’s Supreme Petroleum Council.

Al Mazroui is the vice-chairman of the Emirates Nuclear Energy Corporation.

Al Mazroui serves as Vice Chairman on the Supreme Committee for Abu Dhabi's Water & Electricity.

On July 5, 2020, the UAE Prime Minister and ruler of Dubai, Sheikh Mohammed bin Rashid Al Maktoum announced a cabinet restructure where the Ministry of Energy & Industry was merged with the Ministry of Infrastructure Development, under the tutelage of Suhail Al Mazroui. Al Mazroui, now minister of Energy and Infrastructure, will also oversee the Zayed Housing Program and the Federal Authority Land and Maritime Transport.

Institutional Oversight

Al Mazroui Chairs and serves on various institutional boards. Suhail has been with Mubadala since  2007;  as such, Al Mazroui is the Chairman of Mubadala Petroleum LLC. Suhail M. Al Mazroui is an Executive Committee and Audit, Risk and Compliance Committee member of the Board of Mubadala Investment Company. Before, Al Mazroui served as  Deputy CEO & Senior VP of New Business Development of Mubadala Oil & Gas, 2007 until 2013.

Al Mazroui is the Chairman of Emirates Liquified Gas Company, a private company, owned by Mubadala; also serves as Chairman of the Borealis Supervisory Board, as of 2015.

Al Mazroui, served as the Chairman of NOVA Chemicals Corporation, a plastic and chemical company, which is a subsidiary of Mubadala; and is the vice-chairman at Nawah Energy Company

Board member of Dolphin Energy; also, Suhail Mohamed Faraj Al Mazroui serves as a Member of the Audit Committee of Abu Dhabi National Oil Company (ADNOC); also served as board member at Tatweer Petroleum Company (Bahrain) and Pearl Energy Group company.

Suhail was appointed as the chairman of the board of directors for the fuel retailer, Emirates General Petroleum (Emarat), in August 2020

Personal life
Suhail Al Mazroui is married and lives in Abu Dhabi with his wife and four children. His uncle is Suhail Faris Ghanem Ateish Al Mazrouei, the Chairman of Dubai Investments Directors, member of the Supreme Petroleum Council of Abu Dhabi, who is the father of the minister of youth, Shamma Al Mazrui.

Notes

References

Emirati businesspeople
Emirati engineers
Energy ministers of the United Arab Emirates
Living people
Petroleum engineers
University of Tulsa alumni
Year of birth missing (living people)